Cheyenne Wells is the Statutory Town that is the county seat and the most populous municipality of Cheyenne County, Colorado, United States.  The town population was 758 at the 2020 United States Census.

History
The community was named for the fact Cheyenne Indians maintained water wells near the original town site.

Geography
Cheyenne Wells is located at  (38.821141, -102.353637). 

A small area about 10 miles southwest of Cheyenne Wells is antipodal, or globally opposite, to Île Saint-Paul, an island in the southern Indian Ocean.

Demographics

As of the census of 2000, there were 1,010 people, 417 households, and 261 families residing in the town. The racial makeup of the town was 91.19% White, 0.99% African American, 0.79% Native American, 0.10% Asian, 6.44% from other races, and 0.50% from two or more races. Hispanic or Latino of any race were 9.90% of the population.

There were 417 households, out of which 33.3% had children under the age of 18 living with them, 53.5% were married couples living together, 6.5% had a female householder with no husband present, and 37.2% were non-families. 33.3% of all households were made up of individuals, and 13.7% had someone living alone who was 65 years of age or older.  The average household size was 2.38 and the average family size was 3.08.

In the town, the population was spread out, with 27.2% under the age of 18, 8.1% from 18 to 24, 27.9% from 25 to 44, 20.8% from 45 to 64, and 15.9% who were 65 years of age or older.  The median age was 38 years. For every 100 females, there were 100.0 males.  For every 100 females age 18 and over, there were 99.7 males.

The median income for a household in the town was $36,563, and the median income for a family was $45,132. Males had a median income of $32,941 versus $23,077 for females. The per capita income for the town was $18,840.  About 7.5% of families and 11.1% of the population were below the poverty line, including 12.4% of those under age 18 and 12.2% of those age 65 or over.

Economy
Tumbleweed Midstream owns the Ladder Creek Helium Plant near Cheyenne Wells.  It is only one of fourteen helium plants in the world.

Infrastructure

Transportation

Rail
The Union Pacific Railroad passes through Cheyenne Wells.

Highways
 U.S. Highway 40 passes through the community and follows roughly parallel to the railway.

Notable people
Notable individuals who were born in or have lived in Cheyenne Wells include:
 Nellie M. Payne (1900-1990), agricultural chemist, entomologist

See also

Colorado
Bibliography of Colorado
Index of Colorado-related articles
Outline of Colorado
List of counties in Colorado
List of municipalities in Colorado
List of places in Colorado

References

External links

Town of Cheyenne Wells website
CDOT Map of the Town of Cheyenne Wells

Towns in Cheyenne County, Colorado
Towns in Colorado
County seats in Colorado